Maurizio Casadei (born 15 May 1962) is a Sammarinese former cyclist. He competed at the 1980 Summer Olympics and the 1984 Summer Olympics.

References

External links
 

1962 births
Living people
Sammarinese male cyclists
Olympic cyclists of San Marino
Cyclists at the 1980 Summer Olympics
Cyclists at the 1984 Summer Olympics